"Heart Trouble" is a song recorded by American country music artist Martina McBride.  It was released on October 24, 1994 as the fourth single from the album The Way That I Am.  The song reached #21 on the Billboard Hot Country Singles & Tracks chart.  The song was written by Paul Kennerley.

In 2003, Wanda Jackson covered the song and made it the title track to her album of the same name.

Chart performance

References

1994 singles
1993 songs
Martina McBride songs
Wanda Jackson songs
Songs written by Paul Kennerley
Song recordings produced by Paul Worley
RCA Records Nashville singles